Imigrante (population: 3,100) is a city in Rio Grande do Sul, located in south Brazil, situated in the state's Taquari Valley region. It was established by German and Italian immigrants.  Imigrante calls itself, Terra do Cactos, or Land of the Cactus.

The city is 100 m above sea level. Its climate is subtropical. 

Imigrante's economy centers on the metallurgy industry. 

The mayor is Paulo Gilberto Altmann, of the PP party.

Notable people
 

Felipe Spellmeier (born 1986), footballer

Gallery

References

External links
 Imigrante city's web site

Municipalities in Rio Grande do Sul